Dakota Joe or Man and a Colt is a 1967 Argentine Spaghetti Western film directed by Tulio Demicheli, produced by Alberto Grimaldi, and starring Robert Hundar, Fernando Sancho, Gloria Milland, Mirko Ellis, Luis Gaspar, and José Canalejas.

It was shot in desierto de Tabernas in Almería; in Manzanares el Real, Seseña and Torrejón de Ardoz in the community of Madrid; and Italy. It is set in Texas and México.

Cast

References

External links
 

Spaghetti Western films
Argentine Western (genre) films
1967 Western (genre) films
1967 films
Films directed by Tulio Demicheli
Films produced by Alberto Grimaldi
Films produced by Tulio Demicheli
Films with screenplays by Tulio Demicheli
Films scored by Lallo Gori
Films shot in Almería
Films shot in Madrid
Texas Revolution films
Mexican Revolution films
Italian multilingual films
Spanish multilingual films
1960s Italian films